Heer Ranjha is a 1992 Indian Hindi-language film directed by Harmesh Malhotra and starring Anil Kapoor, Sridevi, Anupam Kher, Shammi Kapoor. It was released on 7 August 1992. The film is based on the legend of Heer Ranjha, the epic poem Heer by Punjabi poet Waris Shah, written in 1766.

Cast
Anil Kapoor as Dido / Ranjha
Sridevi as Heer
Shammi Kapoor as Chochak Chaudhary
Anupam Kher as Kaedo
Gufi Paintal as Kazi
Pankaj Dheer as Sultan
Tinnu Anand as Baba
Sushma Seth as Mrs. Chochak Chaudhary
Mangal Dhillon as Zaida
Priti Sapru as Sethe (Zaida's Sister)
Rakesh Bedi as Ludan
Satyen Kappu as Sage
Goga Kapoor as Mauju Chaudhary

Soundtrack 
The music was composed by Laxmikant-Pyarelal and lyrics for all songs were penned by Anand Bakshi.

Reception 
Audience really liked the movie. Kundan Pandey gave it 3 stars.

References

External links 
 

1992 films
1990s Hindi-language films
Heer Ranjha
Films based on Indian folklore
Films directed by Harmesh Malhotra
Indian romance films
Films scored by Laxmikant–Pyarelal
Hindi-language romance films

Films based on poems